Strawbs are an English progressive rock band from London. Formed in early 1963 as the Strawberry Hill Boys, the group was originally an acoustic trio consisting of Dave Cousins on vocals, guitar and banjo; Tony Hooper on vocals, guitar and percussion; and Arthur Phillips on mandolin and vocals. The band's current lineup includes Cousins (a constant member, save for a brief period in 1980), guitarist and vocalist Dave Lambert (from 1972 to 1978, 1999 to 2001, and since 2004), bassist and vocalist Chas Cronk (from 1973 to 1980, and since 2004), drummer Tony Fernandez (from 1977 to 1980, 2010 to 2012, and since 2014), and keyboardist and guitarist Dave Bainbridge (since 2015)

History

1963–1972
The Strawbs were formed as the Strawberry Hill Boys in early 1963, made up of Dave Cousins on vocals, guitar and banjo; Tony Hooper on guitar, percussion and vocals; and Arthur Phillips on mandolin and vocals. In June 1964, Phillips left and double bassist "Talking" John Berry took over as the band's third member. Berry was replaced by Ron Chesterman in the autumn of 1966. Early the next summer, singer-songwriter Sandy Denny joined the band to make it a four-piece for the first time, with the quartet recording All Our Own Work that July. Denny had left by the end of the year, with Sonja Kristina taking her place for one show before the group reverted to a trio.

Cousins, Hooper and Chesterman released Strawbs' self-titled debut album in May 1969. In August, the group became a quartet again with the addition of Claire Deniz as their first cellist. This lineup recorded Dragonfly, which was issued in February 1970 after Deniz had been replaced by Lindsay L. Cooper. The next month, the group added Rick Wakeman as their first keyboardist. Just a few weeks later, Chesterman left the band and Cooper took over on bass. By the beginning of May, Elmer Gantry's Velvet Opera members John Ford and Richard Hudson had joined the group on bass and drums, respectively, as their style moved away from being primarily acoustic.

After releasing live album Just a Collection of Antiques and Curios and studio album From the Witchwood, Wakeman left Strawbs in August 1971 to join Yes. He was replaced by Derek "Blue" Weaver of Fair Weather. Grave New World followed in early 1972, before founding member Tony Hooper left that August. In a 1991 interview, Hooper credited his departure to musical differences, recalling that "I felt that we were the best at what we did ... But there was pressure to succeed in America, and that entailed a move towards rock. I considered that to move in that direction would be to move into competition with many bands who were very good at what they did".

1972–1980
Tony Hooper was replaced by Dave Lambert, who had just performed on Dave Cousins' solo debut Two Weeks Last Summer. The new lineup released Bursting at the Seams at the beginning of 1973, before the group splintered in the summer when Ford, Weaver and Hudson were all fired after allegedly attempting to oust Cousins. That July, the frontman and Lambert introduced a new lineup with bassist Chas Cronk (formerly a session musician), keyboardist John Hawken (previously of the Nashville Teens) and drummer Rod Coombes (from Juicy Lucy and Stealers Wheel). After releasing Hero and Heroine and Ghosts, Hawken left Strawbs and Nomadness was recorded with various session keyboardists. After the recording of Nomadness, Hawken was replaced by John Mealing and Robert Kirby. The new two-keyboard lineup released Deep Cuts and Burning for You, after which Coombes left the group. He was replaced in time for the recording of Deadlines by Rick Wakeman's drummer Tony Fernandez.

At the end of 1977, Andy Richards replaced Mealing and Kirby. The band began recording Heartbreak Hill in May 1978, but after tracking just one song, Lambert left the band; Jo Partridge of Cockney Rebel was brought in to complete the album. Heartbreak Hill was not released until 1995. By the end of 1978, Lambert's space had been taken by Brian Willoughby. Following the release of the single "The King", frontman Dave Cousins left Strawbs in June 1980 to take a job at Radio Tees, with Roy Hill taking his place in the band. Hill and the remaining members were joined by guitarist John Knightsbridge and saxophonist Bimbo Acock for a pair of gigs, before disbanding.

1983–2003
In July 1983, the Grave New World lineup of the Strawbs (Dave Cousins, Tony Hooper, John Ford, Blue Weaver and Richard Hudson) reformed with lead guitarist Brian Willoughby, debuting at that year's Cambridge Folk Festival. Weaver was replaced by Chris Parren in late 1984, and Ford was replaced by Rod Demick in the summer of 1985. This lineup remained stable for several years, releasing the band's first studio album since reforming, Don't Say Goodbye, in 1987. During late 1992, Don Airey temporarily replaced Parren on tour, as he was working on the Rocky Horror Show production in London. By summer 1993, Weaver had returned to the band.

After several years of only sporadic appearances, in August 1998 the Strawbs performed a 30th anniversary show which was later released as The Complete Strawbs, featuring short sets from various different incarnations of the band, including their current lineup. Early the next year, with returning members John Ford and Dave Lambert, the group returned to regular touring. After tours in 2000 and 2001, the group went on hiatus as Cousins, Lambert and Willoughby focused on their Acoustic Strawbs side project started in late 2000. During this period, various recent and previous members of the band recorded Blue Angel, which was released in April 2003.

Since 2004
In the spring of 2004, the 1973–1975 Hero and Heroine lineup of the Strawbs (Dave Cousins, Dave Lambert, Chas Cronk, John Hawken and Rod Coombes) reformed, touring and releasing Déjà Fou. This lineup remained constant for four years, before Hawken announced his retirement from the group in June 2008. In January 2009, former keyboardist Rick Wakeman's eldest son Oliver Wakeman was announced as Hawken's replacement for upcoming shows. Dancing to the Devil's Beat was released later that year. In September 2010, it was announced that Tony Fernandez was returning and John Young was replacing Wakeman for tour dates at the end of the year. In late 2012, Fernandez and Young were replaced by Adam Falkner and Oliver Wakeman's younger brother Adam Wakeman.

By early 2014, Fernandez had returned to his role as drummer for the Strawbs. Wakeman had left by the end of 2015, replaced by Dave Bainbridge. The group has since released two new studio albums: 2017's The Ferryman's Curse and 2021's Settlement.

Members

Current

Former

Timeline

Lineups

References

External links
Strawbs official website

Strawbs